Bacchisa argenteifrons is a species of beetle in the family Cerambycidae. It was described by Gahan in 1907. It is known from Malaysia.

References

A
Beetles described in 1907